Stephen Hogan is an Irish actor and audiobook narrator.

Biography 
Hogan was born in August 1965 and grew up in Darty, Dublin, Ireland.  Hogan says he studied architecture at Edinburgh University but upon graduating did not see himself in that profession for the remainder of his life.  He says he obtained financially useful scholarship to Royal College of Music and Drama in Glasgow (Royal Conservatoire of Scotland), and was also able to obtain a part-time job in an architect's office at the same time.

Upon qualifying from drama school in 1992 Hogan says he was lucky to get a role on the long running Scottish Soap drama Take the High Road with its "crazy characters", his recollections of his storylines as new character was "I worked my way through the entire female case over 60 episodes".  He moved to London after leaving the soap, but has returned to Ireland frequently for work and pleasure since.

His uncle, Paul Hogan, was one of two students behind the audacious 1956 theft of Summer's Day from the Tate Gallery.  Hogan played his uncle in a radio play based on the event in 2005, and is collaboration on attempts to develop a film based on the theft. Hogan states on Twitter he is a director of Gallery Films.

Hogan adapted to the UK's first Covid-19 Pandemic lockdown by adapting purchasing a quality digital microphone and investing in acoustic paneling which enabled him to record audiobooks such as City in Flames, though he says building work pile-driving near his home has caused inconveniences.  He say he voiced the character Kurtz from the Conrad novel Heart of Darkness from his home for a BBC4 production.

Hogan has interviewed about the upcoming Netflix 2022 release of Vikings: Valhalla where he has the character of  Ealdorman Sigeferth of Wessex.

Works

Film 
Hogan played Sky Marshall Omar Anoke in science-fiction film Starship Troopers 3: Marauder. He played the lead role of Adam Smith in Iraq war drama Kingdom of Dust: Beheading of Adam Smith, in which critic Justin Richards averred that he "manages to portray an okay representation" of hostage Adam Smith.

Television

Radio and audio 
Hogan has also narrated a number of audiobook recordings with Penguin Random House. The audio book of The Secret Place won Library Journal's Best Media 2014. His respective narration in The Heart's Invisible Furies and Typhoon won the AudioFile Magazine Earphone Awards.

Theatre and musical 
Having trained at Royal Conservatoire of Scotland, he has worked extensively in UK and Irish theaters.

References

External links
 

Irish male film actors
Irish male television actors
20th-century Irish male actors
21st-century Irish male actors
Irish film producers
Living people
1965 births
Male actors from Dublin (city)